Italian South Africans are South Africans who have full or partial Italian ancestry. They are primarily descended from Italians who emigrated to South Africa during the late 19th century and early 20th century.

History 
Apart from a few Catholic missionaries, Italian emigration to South Africa was very limited until the end of the 19th century. Some Italian traders, such as Theresa Viglione, were present in small numbers alongside the Boers, when they made their Great Trek towards the Transvaal and Natal, but only in the early 20th century did the Italians form a small community of about 5,000 people, concentrated in the major cities of the Union of South Africa.

In 1900, there were 200 Italians in the Cape Colony and before 1910 about 1,200 in the Transvaal which was hugely reduced after the support given by Camillo Ricchiardi's Italian Volunteer Legion to the Boer insurgents. Many were miners (gold prospectors), traders and builders. However, already in 1915, there were almost 4,000 Italians in all of South Africa, and among them many were professionals such as engineers, doctors and lawyers. Italian immigrants mainly found employment as stonemasons, bricklayers, craftsmen, carpenters, metal workers and railway workers.

During Fascism there was almost no Italian emigration to South Africa, and at the outbreak of World War II about 800 Italian South Africans were interned for security reasons.

At the end of the 1940s, many thousands of Italian ex-internees, who had established working relationships with South Africans during their imprisonment, decided to emigrate to South Africa. This was the case of the father of Italian South African runner Marcello Fiasconaro, an Italian pilot shot down during a bombing in Kenya and interned in Zonderwater. Numerous families of Istrian-Dalmatian exiles reached South Africa.

In the 1950s, the South African government began to favor the immigration of Italians, who settled mainly in the Cape Province. Subsequently, with the beginning of Apartheid, a selected flow of Italians was promoted, also with the aim of increasing the white population in South Africa.

In the early 1970s, there were over 40,000 Italians in South Africa, scattered throughout the provinces but concentrated in the main cities. Some of these Italians had taken refuge in South Africa, escaping the decolonization of Rhodesia and other African states.

In the 1990s, a period of crisis began for Italian South Africans and many returned to Europe; however, the majority successfully integrated into the multiracial society of contemporary South Africa.

The Italian community consists of over 77,400 people (0.1–2% of South Africa's population), half of whom have Italian citizenship. Those of Venetian origin number about 5,000, mainly residing in Johannesburg, while the most numerous Italian regional communities are the southern ones. The official Italian registry records 28,059 Italians residing in South Africa in 2007, excluding South Africans with dual citizenship.

Italian press and institutions in South Africa
The Italian-language press in South Africa essentially consists of three publications:
 La Gazzetta del Sudafrica ("The Gazette of South Africa"), daily newspaper (Cape Town, since 2006), publisher Ciro Migliore.
 Insieme ("Together"), bimonthly (Durban, since 1989), publisher Comites Kwazulu Natal and Consulate of Italy in Durban.
 La Voce ("The Voice"), weekly (Johannesburg, since 1975), publisher Pier Luigi Porciani (owned by AIISA).

The most important Italian associations and institutions in South Africa are:
 The Associazione Assistenziale Italiana ("Italian Welfare Association") of Johannesburg, the Unitas (Unione Italiana Assistenza, "Italian Assistance Union") of Durban and the Fondo Assistenza Italiana ("Italian Assistance Fund") of Cape Town.
 The Circolo Ricreativo Anziani Italiani ("Italian Elderly Recreational Club") of Johannesburg and the Circolo Anziani ("Elderly Club") of Cape Town.
 The Johannesburg Italian Ladies Society of Italian-South African women.
 Casa Serena ("peaceful home"), a rest home for the elderly, wanted and built with direct funding from Italians from South Africa and partially supported by the Italian and South African governments.
 The Scuola italiana del Capo ("Cape Italian School") in Cape Town and Port Elizabeth.
 The Dante Alighieri Society, present in Johannesburg, Cape Town, Durban and Pietermaritzburg which spreads the Italian culture and language in South Africa.
 The Circolo Culturale Italo Sudafricano ("Italian South African Cultural Circle") and other Italian social clubs in: Johannesburg, Pretoria, Cape Town, Durban, Benoni, Nigel, Vereeniging, Umkomaas, Ladysmith, Port Elizabeth and East London.

Notable Italian South Africans

Sport
 Carlo Del Fava, South African-born Italian former rugby union player
 Lorenzo Masselli, South African-born Italian former rugby union player
 Giulio Giuricich, South African footballer
 Alessio Angelucci, South African baseball player
 Davide Somma, South African footballer
 Dino Quattrocecere, South African figure skater
 Ramon di Clemente, South African rower and Olympic medalist
 Dylan Frittelli, South African golfer
 Rory Sabbatini, South African golfer
 Hugh Baiocchi, South African golfer
 Orazio Cremona, South African shot-putter
 Giulio Zorzi, South African swimmer
 Andrew Northcote, South African-born Italian cricketer (born to an Italian South African mother)
 Angelo Gigli, South African-born Italian basketball player
 Dario Chistolini, South African-born Italian rugby union player
 Damian Crowley, South African-born Italian cricketer (born to an Italian South African mother)
 Eddie Firmani, South African-born Italian former footballer
 Marcello Fiasconaro, South African-Italian former athlete and one-time men's 800 metres world record holder
 Jade Dernbach, South African-born English Cricketer (born to an Italian mother and South African father)
 Craig Bianchi, South African former footballer
 JJ Gagiano, South African-born American rugby union player
 Vince Pennazza, South African-born Italian cricketer
 Mike Bernardo, South African kickboxer and boxer
 Zane Weir, South African-born Italian shot putter
 Braam Steyn, South African-born Italian rugby union player

Business

 Desmond Sacco, chairman and Managing Director of Assore Limited

Radio & TV
 Amor Vittone, Afrikaans singer and TV presenter (Italian father)
 Debora Patta, broadcast journalist and television producer
 Tullio Moneta, actor
 Vittorio Leonardi, South African stand-up comedian and actor
 Karin Giannone, South African-born BBC English television newsreader

Politics
Belinda Bozzoli
 Mario Oriani-Ambrosini, constitutional lawyer and politician of the Inkatha Freedom Party
 Natasha Mazzone, South African politician and Chief Whip of the Official Opposition (since 2019)
 Elizabeth Maria Molteno
 John Charles Molteno
 John Charles Molteno, Jr.
 James Tennant Molteno

Other
 Carlo Gagiano, former Chief of the South African Air Force
 Don Mattera, anti-apartheid activist, poet and author
 Edoardo Villa, South African sculptor
 David Ferraris, racehorse trainer

See also

Italian diaspora
Italy–South Africa relations
White South Africans
Italian Zimbabweans
Italian Americans
Italian Canadians
Italian Australians
Italians
White Africans

References

Bibliography

External links
 Italian embassy in Pretoria
 Italian consulate in Cape Town
 South African Ministry of Foreign Affairs about relations with Italy
  South African embassy in Rome

 
White South African people
Ethnic groups in South Africa
South Africans
South Africans